Greece competed at the 1900 Summer Olympics in Paris, France.
Three Greek competitors had four entries in three events spread over two disciplines.  None of the Greek athletes won a medal.

Athletics

Two Greek athlete competed in two throwing events in the athletics program, with Paraskevopoulos taking 4th and 5th place in the two events and Versis not recording a fair mark in his only event.

Golf

Greece was one of four nations to compete in the first Olympic golf events.

Nations at the 1900 Summer Olympics
1900
Olympics